Parliament Hill is a hill in Ottawa, Canada

Parliament Hill may also refer to:
 Parliament Hill (Quebec City), a hill in Quebec City, Canada
Parliament Hill, London, a hill in north London, United Kingdom
Parliament Hill Fields, a park area in London
Parliament Hill Lido, a lido in London
Parliament Hill School, a school in London

See also
 
 
 Capitol Hill (disambiguation)
 Capital Hill (disambiguation)

fr:Colline parlementaire